Antonio Millo, also mentioned as Antonio da Millo or Antonio Milo, active during 1557–1590, was captain and cartographer with significant work in map making, isolarios and portolan charts.

He was born during the 16th century in Milos and he lived part of his life in Venice as shown from records of the Greek community of Venice. According to the first Book of Marriages 1599–1701 of the Greek community of Venice, someone called "Antonio Damilos" was married on 10 August 1599.

Apart from cartographer, he was a captain and navigator. In an isolario of 1590, he is mentioned as Armiralgio al Zante. In another isolario of 1591 he is mentioned as Armiralgio in Candia and in another he is mentioned as Antonius de Melo Cosmographus.

He created many maps with great detail. Several of his works have been saved in Venice (in Biblioteca Marciana di Venezia and Museo Correr), in Rome (Biblioteca Nazionale Centrale di Roma), at Berlin (Staatsbibliothek) in London (British Library) and Warsaw (National Library).

References

Sources 
Ιζολάριο και Πορτολάνος Εμού Του Αντωνίου Μίλο
Antonio Millo, Bacino del Mediterraneo
Antonio Millo, Planisfero

External links
 Maps of Antonio Millo at Pandektis, Digital Thesaurus of Primary Sources for Greek History and Culture.

Greek cartographers
16th-century Italian cartographers
Year of death unknown
Year of birth unknown
People from Milos